Cage Force (former name Demolition Octagon Gear (D.O.G.)) is a defunct Japanese Mixed Martial Arts (MMA) organization operated by Greatest Common Multiple (GCM) Communication. It was the first Japanese MMA organization to feature an octagon cage instead of a ring. Yushin Okami, Eiji Mitsuoka, Kuniyoshi Hironaka and Keita Nakamura experienced a cage match in D.O.G before contract with UFC. It enforced the Unified Rules of Mixed Martial Arts when the changed name to "Cage Force" from "D.O.G.", to prepare Japanese MMA fighters for the UFC. Cage Force tournament winner was entitled to a contract with UFC. Yoshiyuki Yoshida and Takeya Mizugaki have been contracted to the UFC and WEC by winning the tournament.

History

D.O.G.
On March 12, 2005, the first event of D.O.G. held at Differ Ariake in Tokyo, Japan. Yushin Okami defeated Brian "Tattoo" Foster by Submission at Main event.

On June 11, 2005, Second event "D.O.G. 2" held. Yushin Okami defeated Nick Thompson by Thompson's Elbow Injury at 29 seconds of the 1st round. Hidetaka Monma defeated Dave Strasser by KO of the 1st round.

Cage Force
On September 28, 2006, GCM Communication announced the inauguration of "World Wide Cage Network (WWCN)" meaning cooperation with five MMA organizations in the world. GCM Communication changed name to "Cage Force (Named by Caol Uno)" from the "D.O.G.". and Cage Force held On November 25, 2006.

On 2007,Cage Forece held the lightweight and Welterweight tournament. Artur Oumakhanov defeated Kotetsu Boku via Split Decision and Won Cage Force lightweight Championship. Yoshiyuki Yoshida defeated Dan Hardy via DQ and Won Cage Force Welterweight Championship. Yoshida contracted with the UFC, but Oumakhanov could not contract with the UFC because he lost to Andre Amade at Hero's During the tournament.

On 2008,Cage Forece held the Featherweight and Bantamweight tournament. Yuji Hoshino defeated Akiyo Nishiura via Unanimous Decision and Won Cage Force Featherweight Championship. Takeya Mizugaki defeated Masahiro Oishi by TKO and Won Cage Force Bantamweight Championship. Mizugaki contracted with the WEC and fought Miguel Torres for the WEC Bantamweight Championship of WEC 40 on April 5, 2009.

Valkyrie
On September 27, 2008, Valkyrie was established and the first event was promoted In the first part of "Cage Force EX" on November 8, 2008.

Stopping the GCM
On November 11, 2011, Wajyutsu Keisyukai announced the inauguration of new players association. and They Separated from the GCM Communication because virtually cessation of activity by GCM. Cage Force was Virtually completed in the last event "Cage Force 20" on November 28, 2010.

Events

Cage Force

D.O.G.

Current Cage Force champions

Title history

Welterweight Championship
Weight limit:

Lightweight Championship
Weight limit:

Featherweight Championship
Weight limit:

Bantamweight Championship
Weight limit:

Tournaments

Welterweight Tournament Bracket

Lightweight Tournament Bracket

Featherweight Tournament Bracket

Bantamweight Tournament Bracket

See also
 Valkyrie

References

External links
 Official website (Disappearance) 
 Official blog 
 GCM Communication event results at sherdog

Mixed martial arts organizations